The Weeks Formation is a geologic formation in Utah. It preserves fossils dating back to the Cambrian period and more specifically the Guzhangian stage. Its upper part has yielded a diverse fauna dominated by trilobites and brachiopods, but also comprising various soft-bodied organisms, such as Falcatamacaris. As such, it is regarded as a Konservat-Lagerstätte.

See also

 List of fossiliferous stratigraphic units in Utah
 Paleontology in Utah

References

 

Cambrian geology of Utah
Cambrian southern paleotropical deposits
Lagerstätten